Hydroelectricity is the second most important renewable energy source after solar energy in Japan with an installed capacity of 50.0 gigawatt (GW) as of 2019. According to the International Hydropower Association Japan was the world's sixth largest producer of hydroelectricity in 2020. Most of Japanese hydroelectric power plants are pumped-storage plants. Conventional hydropower plants account for about 20 GW out of the total installed capacity as of 2007.

Conventional hydropower potential of Japan is considered to be almost fully developed, with little opportunity for further capacity increase. In recent years, almost exclusively pumped storage plants were commissioned, significantly increasing the ratio of pumped storage capacity over conventional hydro. The large capacity of pumped storage hydropower was built to store energy from nuclear power plants, which until the Fukushima disaster constituted a large part of Japan electricity generation. As of 2015, Japan is the country with the highest capacity of pumped-storage hydroelectricity in the world, with 26 GW of power installed. After the 2011 nuclear power shutdowns, pumped-storage plants have been increasingly used to balance the variable generation of renewable energy sources such as solar, which have been growing rapidly in recent years.

As of September 2011, Japan had 1,198 small hydropower plants with a total capacity of 3,225 megawatt (MW). The smaller plants accounted for 6.6% of Japan's total hydropower capacity. The remaining capacity was filled by large and medium hydropower stations, typically sited at large dams. Cost per kilowatt-hour for power from smaller plants was high at ¥15-100, hindering further development of the energy source.

List of hydroelectric power stations

See also

 Energy in Japan
 Electricity sector in Japan
 Geothermal power in Japan
 Wind power in Japan
 Solar power in Japan
 Renewable energy by country

References

 
Japan
Japan, Hydroelectric
Power stations, hydroelectric